Pepita Orduna was a Spanish film editor active in the 1940s and 1950s who worked with filmmakers like Luis G. Berlanga and Antonio del Amo.

Selected filmography 

 An American in Toledo (1960)
 Juicio final (1960)
 Hospital general (1958)
 Ángeles sin cielo (1957)
 Miracles of Thursday (1957)
 La mestiza (1956)
 The Rocket from Calabuch (1956)
 Miedo (1956)
 Mañana cuando amanezca (1955)
 Cancha vasca (1955)
 Cursed Mountain (1954)
 Boyfriend in Sight (1954)
 El pescador de coplas (1954)
 That Happy Couple (1953)
 Bella, la salvaje (1953)
 Welcome Mr. Marshall! (1953)
 Don Juan Tenorio (1952)
 Em-Nar, la ciudad de fuego (1952)
 Día tras día (1951)
 Cita con mi viejo corazón (1950)
 Embrujo (1948) (assistant)

References

External links 

 

Spanish women film editors
Spanish film editors